The Kessler Apartments in Kansas City, Missouri were built in 1925. They were listed on the National Register of Historic Places on October 22, 2002 as part of a group of buildings on the north end of Paseo Boulevard.

See also
 Historic preservation
 National Register of Historic Places listings in Jackson County, Missouri: Kansas City other

References

External links 
  
 
 
 

Residential buildings completed in 1925
Buildings and structures in Kansas City, Missouri
Residential buildings on the National Register of Historic Places in Missouri
National Register of Historic Places in Kansas City, Missouri